Max Johann Otto Adolf Tortilowicz von Batocki-Friebe, usually known as Adolf von Batocki-Friebe (31 July 1868 – 22 May 1944), was a German noble, lawyer and politician, and belonged to a noble Lithuanian family.
 
Batocki-Friebe was born at Gut Bledau, Cranz near Königsberg, East Prussia.

First World War roles
He served as Governor of East Prussia (1 October, 1914–1916 and 1918–1919), member of the Prussian House of Lords (1910–1918). He was also President of the Reichsernährungsamt (Imperial Nutrition Office) (1916–1917).

The onset of the war led to an initial wave of refugees fleeing those areas that the Imperial German Army felt could not be effectively defended. This led to a humanitarian crisis which the authorities hoped to mitigate by setting up the War Aid Commission (Kriegshilfskommission). At their first plenary held on 12 October 1914, Batocki outlined his approach:
"The most difficult work that we face in the East after our final victory will not be the work of restoring the economic damage. It will not be anything that can be achieved with money. It will lie rather in strengthening and firming up our population. Only when that succeeds can East Prussia fulfill its task as a stronghold of Germandom."

He was a Knight of Justice of the Order of Saint John.

Publications 
 Ostpreussens Vergangenheit, Gegenwart und Zukunft, 1915.
 Die Preisbildung im Kriege 1916. (with Karl Thieß)
 Ostpreußen in Harren und Krieg, in Sturz und Sieg, 1916. (with Paul Burg)
 Russisch als Pflichtfach an höheren Schulen der Ostprovinzen, 1918. (with Joh Gerschmann)
 Vom Kampfe um das Geschick Ostpreußens, 1919.
 Warenpreis und Geldwert im Kriege, 1919.
 Wie kann die innere Siedlung und Bodenausnutzung schnell und wirksam [...], 1919.
 Umstellung der Landwirtschaft, 1920.
 Ostpreussens wirtschaftliche Lage vor und nach dem Weltkriege, 1920.
 Schluss mit Kriegszwangswirtschaft!, 1921.
 Staatsreferendar und Staatsassessor, 1927. (with Werner Friedrich Bruck, Heinrich von Friedberg)
 Preussen, der Kern der deutschen Verfassungsfrage, 1928.
 Bevölkerung und Wirtschaft in Ostpreussen, 1929. (with Gerhard Schack)
 Bedeutung und Umfang der Meliorationen in Deutschland, 1931.
 Die Bedeutung landwirtschaftlicher Meliorationen in Ostpreussen im Rahmen..., 1933. (with Otto Heinemann, Kurt Stüwe)

References

Literature 
Genealogisches Handbuch des Adels, Adelige Häuser B Band XVIII, Seite 484, Band 95 der Gesamtreihe, C. A. Starke Verlag, Limburg (Lahn) 1989, 
Acta Borussica, Band 9 (1900–1909) (PDF-Datei; 2,74 MB)
Acta Borussica, Band 10 (1909–1918) (PDF-Datei; 2,74 MB)
 Dieter Stüttgen: Die preussische Verwaltung des Regierungsbezirks Gumbinnen, 1871–1920, 1980, S. 38–40.
 Fried von Batocki, Klaus von der Groeben: Adolf von Batocki. Ein Lebensbild. Im Einsatz für Ostpreußen und das Reich. Ostsee-Verlag, Raisdorf 1998.

External links 

 

1868 births
1944 deaths
People from the Province of Prussia
People from Zelenogradsk
Members of the Prussian House of Lords
German people of Lithuanian descent